The People's Republic of China is an officially atheist state, which while having freedom of religion as a principle nominally enshrined with the laws and constitution of the country, nevertheless possesses a number of laws that restrict religious activities within China.

This article details the various pieces of legislation governing religious activities in China.

1982 Constitution (last amended in 2004) 

(see Constitution of China)

Article 36 of the Chinese constitution explicitly deals with religious affairs. It states:

"The People's Republic of China has freedom of faith and religion

No state organization, social group or individual may force a citizen to accept or not to accept a religious faith, nor can they discriminate against either religious or non-religious citizens.

The state protects normal religious activities. No one may use religion to make an attack on the order of society, harm the physical health of citizens, or impede the activities of the state's education system.

Religious groups and religious affairs shall not be subject to the power of foreign domination."

Banning discrimination against religious citizens in China is usually not interpreted to mean that positions in the government or military are equally open to believers in religions. Communist party membership is often a prerequisite for many government or military positions, and the communist party will frequently not allow religious believers to be members on account of their religious beliefs.

'Normal religious activities' is interpreted to mean religious activities carried out by religious bodies that have official government approval. Religions that are not permitted to exist in China like the Falun Gong or Jehovah's witnesses are not protected by the constitution. Religious groups that are not registered by the government, like Catholics who are part of an underground church or Protestant house churches, are not protected by the constitution. Furthermore, religious activities by approved groups that do not conform to the many regulations governing religion in China are also not protected by the constitution.

'impede the activities of the state's education system' is usually interpreted to mean that educational institutions in China are not permitted to teach religion to students. What this means is that religion can be taught as a subject, but actual religious teaching (i.e. teaching that is intended to help a person to follow a particular religious faith) is considered to be a form of 'impeding the activities of the state's education system' and as such, it is banned by the constitution.

'the power of foreign domination' is usually interpreted to mean that religious bodies in China may not be under the control of foreigners. For example, Roman Catholics may not be under the control of the Pope and the bishops of China must not be subject to the Vatican.

1994 Rules on the Religious Activities of foreigners in China
(see Administrative Rules for the Religious Activities of Foreigners within the borders of the People's Republic of China)

These rules from 1994 are rules governing the religious activities of foreigners within China. The rules protect the rights of foreigners in China to attend religious services or participate in religious activities at approved religious sites. The rules even allow for foreigners to engage in religious preaching or teaching within approved religious sites, so long as they do so with the permission of the approved Chinese religious group.

However, these rules also place a number of restrictions on foreigners in China. They do not allow for foreigners to engage in missionary activities, such as ordaining new religious ministers or converting Chinese citizens to their religion.

Foreign missionaries who come to China are permitted to carry out preaching or religious services within approved religious sites, by these rules, so long as they have the permission of the Chinese religious group, however, outside of the approved religious sites, they are not permitted to carry out most kinds of missionary activities. They can be a religious 'presence', but they cannot engage in preaching in the open public.

2000 Implementation instructions on Rules for Religious Activities of foreigners 
(see Detailed Instructions on the Implementation of the Administrative Rules for the Religious Activities of Foreigners within the Borders of the People's Republic of China

In 2000, the Chinese government issued guidelines regarding the rules for the religious activities of foreigners. These guidelines reiterated, clarified and expanded many of the things from the previous rules. Included among the things mentioned were such things like the explicit banning of foreigners from making religious publications in China, banning foreigners from spreading religious materials in China, banning foreigners from running religious training classes and requiring foreign religious ministers (other than visitors) that preach at Chinese religious sites to be registered with the government.

These instructions provided guidelines for how relations between foreigners and Chinese should occur in the religious sphere, such as rules regarding foreign teachers hired by Chinese religious schools, rules regarding Chinese ministers that give religious rites to foreigners or rules regarding foreign students that study at Chinese religious schools.

The rules once again allowed for foreigners to take part or engage in religious activities at approved religious sites, including preaching or teaching, so long as the relevant rules and guidelines were followed. It once again also did not allow for foreigners to convert Chinese citizens or ordain Chinese citizens as religious ministers.

2004 Regulations on Religious Affairs
(see Regulations on Religious Affairs)

In 2004, the Chinese government issued a detailed set of regulations governing religious activities in China. These regulations replaced a previous set of regulations from 1994.

The regulations required that religious sites, religious ministers, religious schools, religious publications and collective religious activities in general needed government registration or approval, and the regulations set out the procedures by which registration or permissions were to be given.

Most of these activities or items were placed under the supervision of religious affairs departments at different levels of the Chinese government and religious bodies in China were obligated to accept government supervision from these departments.

The regulations also gave a number of protections to religions in China. For example, it banned Chinese citizens from going to approved religious sites with the purpose of disrupting religious activities or of trying to spread atheism. It also guaranteed the lawful rights of believers in carrying out religious activities within approved religious sites.

One of the key parts of the document is chapter 3, governing 'religious activity centres'. In article 12, it states:

"Article 12 – Collective religious activities of believing citizens, in general should be held in the registered religious activity centre (Buddhist temple, Taoist temple, mosque, church and other fixed religious activity centres), under the management of the religious activity centre or the religious organization, conducted by the religious ministers or others who meet the relevant rules of the religion, and done in accordance with the religious creeds and canons."

While the text of the document itself places no explicit universal ban on religious activities from taking place outside of approved religious sites, these regulations are usually interpreted to mean that religious activities involving a large number of people are not allowed to be conducted outside of an approved religious site. There is no definition given as to how many people constitute a 'collective religious activity', however, the regulations in article 6 state:

"Article 6 - The establishment, alteration or cancellation of religious groups shall be handled in accordance with the <<Regulations on Administration and Registration of Social Groups>>

The statutes of religious groups should conform with the relevant rules of the <<Regulations on Administration and Registration of Social Groups>>.

Religious groups that conduct activities in accordance with the statutes, are protected by the law."

The 'Regulations on Administration and Registration of Social Groups' (社会团体登记管理条例) are a group of regulations from 1998 governing the registration of any social group (whether religious or not) within China, and those regulations themselves state that a minimum of 50 persons is required in order to make the application to become a registered group.

These regulations concerning religious sites in China are usually interpreted to mean that things like house churches or other similar sites where believers of a particular religion congregate in large numbers on a regular basis to conduct religious services or religious activities, are not permitted to legally exist.

Things that involve tiny numbers of believers, like religious believers who read scriptures or pray at home, are usually not interpreted to be banned by these regulations. Similarly, the burning of joss paper, a traditional Chinese religious practice wherein people will burn fake paper money or similar things as a ritual offering to dead ancestors or Taoist gods, is actually widely practiced in the open public in China (literally on the city streets themselves), but these laws are usually not interpreted to forbid this.

2006 Procedures for the Registration of Religious Ministers

These rules from 2006 simply detail the procedures used in order to register religious ministers in China. Religious ministers who do not conform to these procedures are not permitted to serve in Chinese religious bodies.

2021 Measures for the Administration of Religious Personnel
The Chinese Communist Party passed a law called "Measures for the Administration of Religious Personnel" that Confucianism, Taoism, Buddhism, Islam and Christianity must be loyal and obey the Chinese Communist Party. Taiwan criticized that law slamming Chinese Communist Party regulating freedom of religion.

2022 Measures governing Internet religious services
In March 2022, China implemented a new set of regulations governing religious content and services on the internet. The new law restricted religious content online to approved sites and services.

See also
Freedom of religion in China
Heterodox teachings (Chinese law)

References

Chinese law
Religion in China